Doctor Laennec (French: Docteur Laennec) is a 1949 French historical drama film directed by Maurice Cloche and starring Pierre Blanchar, Saturnin Fabre and Mireille Perrey. It portrays the work of René Laennec, the inventor of the stethoscope.

The film's art direction was by Robert-Jules Garnier and René Renoux.

Cast
 Pierre Blanchar as Dr. René, Théophile Laennec
 Saturnin Fabre as Laennec père 
 Mireille Perrey as Jacquemine d'Argout-Laennec
 Pierre Dux as Prof. Récamier
 Jany Holt as Madeleine Bayle
 Geymond Vital as Dr. Pierre Bayle 
 Janine Viénot as Marie-Anne Laennec
 Jean Toulout as Docteur Broussais
 Jacques Dynam as Meriadec 
 Lannier as Docteur Louis
 Florent Antony as Beaugendre
 Francette Vernillat as La fille du Docteur Bayle 
 Nicolas Amato
 Charles Bouillaud as Un domestique
 René Clermont as Le mime
 Paul Demage as Le client enrhumé
 France Descaut as Clarisse d'Anthiages
 Christian Duvaleix as Le charlatan
 Guy Favières as Le vieillard
 Georges Galley 
 Léon Larive as Un médecin
 Palmyre Levasseur as Angélique
 Henri Maïk 
 Raphaël Patorni as Un malade
 Georges Paulais as Un médecin
 Marcelle Praince as La duchesse
 Nicole Riche as La moribonde 
 Max Rogerys 
 Lina Roxa 
 Eliane Salmon 
 Evelyne Salmon 
 Charles Vissières as L'éditeur

References

Bibliography 
 Crisp, C.G. The classic French cinema, 1930-1960. Indiana University Press, 1993

External links 
 

1949 films
1940s historical drama films
French historical drama films
1940s French-language films
Films directed by Maurice Cloche
Films set in Paris
Films set in the 1810s
French black-and-white films
1949 drama films
1940s French films